New Hampshire Route 11 is a  east–west state highway in New Hampshire, running completely across the central part of the state. Its western terminus is at the Vermont state line in Charlestown, where it continues west as Vermont Route 11. The eastern terminus is at the Maine state line in Rochester, where it crosses the border with U.S. Route 202 and continues as Maine State Route 11.

Its number is derived from its original 1925 designation as New England Interstate Route 11.

The highway follows a generally southwest to northeast alignment from the Vermont state line until reaching Lake Winnipesaukee, then turns southeast for the remainder of its routing to the Maine state line.

There are 4 auxiliary routes, labeled 11A through 11D, all located along the shores of Lake Winnipesaukee.

Route description

Charlestown to Newport
NH 11 begins on the western bank of the Connecticut River, where VT 11 crosses from Springfield, Vermont, into Charlestown, New Hampshire, just feet from its intersection with US 5. Just north of the town center, the highway meets and joins NH 12 north towards Claremont. NH 12A, a western bypass of downtown Claremont, splits off just south of the city line. In downtown Claremont NH 11 leaves NH 12 and NH 103 joins eastbound, starting a longer  concurrency. The two highways cross the Sugar River and meet the southern terminus of NH 120 before continuing east towards Newport. In downtown Newport, NH 11 and 103 briefly join NH 10 before turning east again to leave town. The two routes continue east for another  before NH 103 splits off to the southeast.

Sunapee to Franklin

NH 11 continues east into Sunapee until reaching the town center, where it meets NH 103B, a connector to the Mount Sunapee Resort. NH 11 turns northward along the western side of Lake Sunapee and rounds the northern end of the lake at Georges Mills, turning back to the east. NH 11 enters the town of New London, meets the northern terminus of NH 103A (which runs along the east side of the lake) and immediately turns onto Interstate 89 south (at exit 12). NH 11 runs along I-89 for  before departing at exit 11. After leaving I-89, NH 11 continues east, crossing NH 114 before entering the town of Wilmot. NH 11 then splits off, continuing northeast into Franklin. The road meets NH 3A near the west bank of the Pemigewasset River, and NH 11 turns south along NH 3A into downtown Franklin.

Franklin to Gilford (duplex with US 3)
Upon reaching the town center, NH 3A ends while NH 11 turns east joining US 3 and NH 127 to cross the Pemigewasset where it meets the Merrimack River. NH 127 immediately splits off to the north, then US 3 and NH 11 continue east across the Winnipesaukee River, paralleling it into Tilton. In the center of Tilton, the road intersects with NH 132 just feet north of the Northfield town line.  NH 132 joins US 3 and NH 11 as the road turns northeast, continuing to parallel the Winnipesaukee River's west side. The highway interchanges with Interstate 93 near the western terminus of NH 140, then NH 132 splits off to the north. Continuing northeast, US 3 and NH 11 cross Lake Winnisquam and skirt the northern tip of Belmont. Just before reaching the city line with Laconia, US 3 and NH 11 split off onto the Gilford-Laconia Bypass, a freeway bypass of those two towns (the historic surface alignment continues into downtown as NH 11A and unsigned US 3 Business). The freeway bypasses downtown Laconia to the south, interchanging with NH 106 and NH 107 before crossing into Gilford, where the road turns due north and interchanges with NH 11A. The freeway ends  to the north, near Laconia Airport, and NH 11 splits off from US 3 after a  concurrency.

Gilford to Rochester
After splitting from US 3, NH 11 intersects with two of its "child" routes, NH 11C and NH 11B, as it heads towards Lake Winnipesaukee. The highway turns southeast along the southern end of the lake and crosses into the town of Alton. NH 11 intersects the eastern terminus of NH 11A before continuing south along the west side of Alton Bay. This section of the highway has views of the bay and of Lake Winnipesaukee as a whole. NH 11D provides local residential access along this semi-limited access section. NH 11 descends into Alton village and intersects with NH 28A, which runs up the eastern side of the bay. NH 11 and NH 28A are cosigned through the downtown area, passing the eastern terminus of NH 140 before meeting NH 28 at a large roundabout, where NH 28A ends. NH 11 continues southeast through New Durham without any major intersections before continuing into Farmington. NH 11 bypasses downtown Farmington to the southwest, with NH 75 and NH 153 providing local access. The highway continues southeast and crosses into the city of Rochester. NH 11 as a standalone route ends at its interchange with the Spaulding Turnpike (NH 16) and US 202, where it leaves its surface alignment and joins the Turnpike at exit 15. US 202 and NH 11 continue through the district of East Rochester before crossing the Salmon Falls River into Lebanon, Maine. US 202 continues across the border while NH 11 becomes Maine State Route 11, which is signed as a north-south highway.

History

Junction list

Suffixed routes

New Hampshire Route 11A

Its western terminus is at US 3 and NH 11 in Belmont, just west of the Laconia city line. Its eastern terminus is in the town of Alton at NH 11. Its western section in downtown Laconia is overlapped by the unsigned US 3 Business and then NH 107.

NH 11A passes through the center of the town of Gilford. Gunstock Mountain Resort, a ski area, is also along the route.

New Hampshire Route 11B

Its northern terminus is at US 3 in the city of Laconia on the shore of Lake Winnipesaukee. The southern terminus is at NH 11A in the town of Gilford.

New Hampshire Route 11C

New Hampshire Route 11C is a short north–south state highway running for  entirely in the town of Gilford. Its southern terminus is at NH 11, just east of the northern end of the US 3 / NH 11 Super 2 freeway, and near the Laconia Municipal Airport. The northern terminus is at NH 11B. The road is named Lily Pond Road along its entire length.

New Hampshire Route 11D

New Hampshire Route 11D is a short state highway running for  entirely in the town of Alton. It acts as a local-traffic loop parallel to NH 11 along Alton Bay.

Concurrent routes
 New Hampshire Route 12:  , Charlestown to Claremont
 New Hampshire Route 103:  , Claremont to Newport
 New Hampshire Route 10:  , Newport
 Interstate 89:  , New London
 U.S. Route 4:  , Andover
 New Hampshire Route 3A:  , Franklin
 U.S. Route 3:  , Franklin to Gilford
 New Hampshire Route 127:  , Franklin
 New Hampshire Route 132:  , Tilton
 New Hampshire Route 28A:  , Alton
 Spaulding Turnpike (NH 16):  , Rochester
 U.S. Route 202:  , Rochester

Related routes
 New England Interstate Route 11, the designation carried by NH 11 in the early 1920s

References

External links

 New Hampshire State Route 11 on Flickr
 New Hampshire State Route 11A on Flickr
 New Hampshire State Route 11B on Flickr

011
Transportation in Sullivan County, New Hampshire
Transportation in Merrimack County, New Hampshire
Transportation in Belknap County, New Hampshire
Transportation in Strafford County, New Hampshire